The 1989 Sudirman Cup was the first tournament of the World Mixed Team Badminton Championships, the Sudirman Cup. It was held from May 24 to May 29, 1989, in Central Jakarta, Indonesia.

Teams
28 teams around the world took part in this tournament. Geographically, they were 13 from Europe, 10 teams from Asia, two from Americas, two from Oceania and one from Africa. India and Pakistan entered the competition but ultimately did not participate.

Results

Group 1

Subgroup A

Subgroup B

Relegation play-off

Semi-finals

Final

Group 2

Group 3

Group 4

Group 5

Group 6

Group 7

Final classification

References

Sudirman Cup
Sudirman Cup
Sudirman Cup
Sudirman Cup
Badminton tournaments in Indonesia